New Kingdom is the debut album by American jazz trumpeter Roy Campbell recorded in 1991 and released on the Delmark label. According to Roy, the title refers to "a whole generation of musicians who've been overlooked, musicians who use avant-garde techniques to develop stuff that refers to the tradition". "I Remember Lee" is dedicated to Roy's teacher Lee Morgan, while "For C.T.", composed by bassist William Parker, is a tribute to valve trombonist Clifford Thornton.

Reception

Alex Henderson, in his review for AllMusic claims "New Kingdom is Campbell's most essential album".
The Penguin Guide to Jazz states "the idea of New Kingdom is to create music that salutes the tradition and still pays heed to the avant-garde."

Track listing
All compositions by Roy Campbell except as indicated
 "I Remember Lee" - 10:33 
 "Angel" (William Parker) - 7:14 
 "Thanks to the Creator"- 6:18 
 "For C.T." (William Parker) - 10:26 
 "Mariescia" - 5:50 
 "Frankenstein & Igor" - 8:40 
 "Peace" (Zane Massey) - 3:46
 "Spiritual Rejuvenation" - 11:04

Personnel
Roy Campbell - trumpet, flugelhorn
Zane Massey - tenor sax on 1, 3 & 7
Ricardo Strobert - alto sax, flute on 1, 3, 5 & 8
Bryan Carrott - vibes on 1, 3, 5 & 8
William Parker - bass
Zen Matsuura - drums

References

Delmark Records albums
Roy Campbell Jr. albums
1992 debut albums